Y is a 2022 Indian Marathi-language thriller film directed by Ajit Suryakant Wadikar and written by Swapneel Sojwal and Ajit Wadikar. The film starring Mukta Barve, Nandu Madhav, Prajakta Mali, Omkar Govardhan, Sandeep Pathak, Rohit Kokate, Suhas Sirsath.  Y was screened at MAMI Festival in 2019. It was scheduled to be theatrically released on 24 June 2022.

Synopsis 
Story of the film Dr. Aarti Deshmukh revolves around a medical officer. Aarti, a mother of a daughter, is tasked with investigating the medical systems involved in female foeticide. In front of the conscientious Aarti who does his job well, Dr. Purushottam stands as a challenge. Despite many attempts, Aarti does not find any evidence against Purushottam. Purushottam eventually uses his powers to transfer Aarti, but in the days remaining before the transfer, Aarti takes up the task of gathering evidence.

Cast 
 Mukta Barve 
 Prajakta Mali 
 Omkar Govardhan
 Sandeep Pathak 
 Nandu Mahadev 
 Rohit Kokate 
 Rasika Chavan 
 Pradeep Bhosale 
 Suhas Sirsat 
 Nitin Bansode

Critical response 
Y film received positive reviews from critics. Kalpeshraj Kubal of The Times of India gave the film 3 stars out of 5 and wrote " Y, which derives its name from the Y is a film that conveys an important message and should be watched for that". Keyur Seta of Cinestaan.com also gave it 3 stars out of 5 and similarly found that "But what really stops this good film from being superlative is the abrupt climax. In fact, when the end credits start rolling, it becomes difficult to believe that the film has ended". A reviewer from Maharashtra Times gave the film a rating of 3/5 and wrote "This movie will surely enlighten you. The movie is also satisfactory in technical terms. The background score is especially good". Vishal Ghatge of ABP Majha also gave it 3 stars out of 5 and wrote "It would have worked even if it had not been told from the very first frame that this movie is a commentary on a serious topic. Without simplifying everything, some things should have been left for the audience to understand".

References

External links